AusGamers is an Australian video game journalism website created by Mammoth Media in 1999. MCVPacific noted it as "one of Australia's longest running online gaming publications, surviving the first dot-com crash, hosting LAN events and building itself into a one-stop files source".

History
AusGamers was initially created in 1999 as a "landing point for local gamers and gaming organizations.

In September 2014, it relaunched its website, having cut ties with media agency MCN in favour of working with You Know Media, headed by Ryan Cunningham."

References

Further reading 
 AusGamers in Virtual Nation: The Internet in Australia

External links

Australian entertainment websites
Gaming websites